Pyramid of the Sun is an album by Maserati. The band's fourth major album, it was released on November 9, 2010.

After the death of the band's drummer, Jerry Fuchs, the album was intended to celebrate his life. The drums for the album had been recorded prior to his death.

Track listing

References 

2010 albums
Maserati (band) albums
Temporary Residence Limited albums